First Lady of Benin (French: Première Dame de la République de Bénin) is the title attributed to the wife of the President of Benin.  Claudine Talon, wife of Patrice Talon, became first lady on her husband's election as president on April 6, 2016. There had been no "first gentleman", or its equivalent, .

History and role
Prior to 1975, when the country's name was changed from the Republic of Dahomey to Benin, the holder of the position was known as the First Lady of Dahomey or wife of the president of Dahomey.

Under the Constitution of Benin, adopted at the National Conference in Cotonou in February 1990, the first lady has no set, official role in government. According to Dodji Amouzouvi, a sociologist and political scientist, "Benin has not yet constitutionalized the role of First Lady. No text yet clearly defines the powers they must have." Instead, a set of customs, protocols, and norms govern the roles and responsibilities of Benin's first ladies. Though the role is not recognized in Beninese law, the first lady has diplomatic, social and political obligations within Beninese politics and society. The first lady often focuses on issues related to socio-economic, education, and healthcare. She will accompany the president on domestic and international trips.

First ladies since Benin's transition from dictatorship to a multi-party system are: Rosine Vieyra Soglo (1991–1996), Marguerite Kérékou (1996–2006), Chantal Yayi (2006–2016), and Claudine Talon (since 2016).

The modern Beninese first ladies have entered politics and other arenas. For example, in 1992 then-First Lady Rosine Vieyra Soglo founded the Benin Rebirth Party (RB) to help garner political support for her husband and his political goals, becoming the first Beninese woman to establish a political party. Vieyra Soglo's successor (and predecessor), Marguerite Kérékou, had a lower profile, but remained a confidante and advisor to her husband, President Mathieu Kérékou. Chantal Yayi, first lady from 2006 to 2016, assisted her older brother, Marcel de Souza, with the creation of a new party.

First Ladies of Benin

References

Benin